Balangir Public School (BPS) is the premiere English medium school in Balangir District. It is affiliated to Central Board of Secondary Education (CBSE). The school is situated at Hatisal Pada of Balangir Town.

History
Balangir Public School was founded by the Lion's Club of Balangir in the year 1979 under the name of Lion's Club Public School. Later in the year 1989 Lion's Club handed over the school to the public of Balangir and subsequently formed an executive managing committee who took charge of running the school. It is to be mentioned that the school was brainchild of two former Lion's club members namely Sri. Harish chandra Nayak and Sri Tribhuvan Das Bhammar. Both of them with the help of other colleagues at Lion's club made it possible for the people of Balangir to get its first English Medium School, then called as Convent School.

Early days
Since its birth till 1987 the school was running on the personal house premises of Mr. Tribhuvan Das Bhammar at Thikadar Para, who allowed it to run all these years without asking for any rent money. The first batch was having only five students and the school started with 1 Principal, 4 teachers, 1 clerk, 1 peon, 2 aya's. Subsequently, due to the concept of first ever nursery play school in Balangir town, BPS started gaining popularity amongst the public and the response was huge.

In the year 1987 due to the increase in number of students, BPS management decided to rent a big building which should cater to maximum number of students. Then they shifted to Rajshri Dharmasala building near samaleswari temple which was having more than 30 huge rooms. The school continued there for more than one decade before shifting to its own building in the year 2000 at Hatisal Para.

Facilities available
Like every modern school, this school is also equipped with
Library
Science laboratories
Computer labs
Playgrounds
Digital Classroom Teaching

Schools in Odisha
Balangir
Educational institutions established in 1979
1979 establishments in Orissa